This page is a list of heirs to the Swedish throne. The list includes all individuals who were considered to inherit the throne of the Kingdom of Sweden, either as heir apparent or as heir presumptive, since the accession of the House of Holstein-Gottorp on 25 March 1751. Those who succeeded as King of Sweden are shown in bold in the table below.

In 1809 a coup d'état against King Gustav IV replaced him with his uncle Karl XIII. As the new king was childless, he and the ruling government arranged for the adoption of an heir to succeed him. The new constitution also suppressed male-preference primogeniture in favour of strict male-line primogeniture.

See also
Duchies in Sweden
Succession to the Swedish throne

Swedish monarchy
Sweden
Sweden
Heirs to the Swedish throne
Heirs to the Swedish throne